Walter Philip Leber (September 12, 1918 – August 3, 2009) served as the Governor of the Panama Canal Zone from 1967 to 1971.

Biography
Born in Saint Louis, Missouri on September 12, 1918, Leber graduated from the Missouri School of Mines in 1940. He also earned an MBA from George Washington University in 1951. He served as the Governor of the Panama Canal Zone from 1967 to 1971.

He died on August 3, 2009 in Palm City, Florida.

Legacy
His honors included admission to the Order of the British Empire.

References

1918 births
2009 deaths
Politicians from St. Louis
Governors of the Panama Canal Zone
Missouri University of Science and Technology alumni
George Washington University School of Business alumni
People from Palm City, Florida